Carolyn A. Maher has been an elementary school teacher, professor of mathematics at Rutgers University, and editor of The Journal of Mathematical Behavior. She founded and is the director of Robert B. Davis Institute for Learning Editor and founded the Video Mosaic Collaborative.

Maher received an Ed.D. (1972), M.Ed. (1965) and B.A. (1962) from Rutgers University with a major in Mathematics Education and a minor in Statistics. She received the 2022 National Council of Teachers of Mathematics (NCTM) Lifetime Achievement Award.

References

Year of birth missing (living people)
Living people
Rutgers University alumni
Rutgers University faculty
American mathematicians